Vajarahalli is a metro station on the Green Line of the Namma Metro. This station was opened on 21 January 2021 to the public. The station was inaugurated along with five other stations, as a part of the Green Line extension.

Station layout

Entry/Exits
There are 2 Entry/Exit points – A and B. Commuters can use either of the points for their travel.

 Entry/Exit point A: Towards Magnum Honda Showroom side
 Entry/Exit point B: Towards DMart Kanakapura Road side

See also 

 Bangalore
 Green Line
 List of Namma Metro stations
 Transport in Karnataka
 List of metro systems
 List of rapid transit systems in India

References 

Namma Metro stations
